The Wonderland Amusement Park operated from 1906 to 1910 in Revere, Massachusetts. Wonderland featured various state-of-the-art rides, attractions, and performers. Although some features remained constant through the life of the Park, most of the attractions changed from year to year. The park was served by the Boston, Revere Beach and Lynn Railroad, known as the "Narrow Gauge".  Today, the rail stop is named Wonderland, and is the northern terminus of the MBTA's Blue Line. The title of the 1998 film Next Stop Wonderland refers to this station.

Bankruptcy

Largely because of the nationwide economic downturn known as the Panic of 1907, Wonderland was bankrupt at the end of the 1908 season. They were able to re-open the next season, but they had to follow an austere regimen, and many attractions were closed down. The Park managed to continue operating until the end of the 1910 season, then closed for good.

Today the site of most of Wonderland is occupied by the Wonderland Marketplace Mall and its parking lot. The Mall buildings occupy the same positions as many of the original Wonderland buildings. This is probably because the site was originally a marsh, and the Wonderland Park builders drove 60,000 spruce pilings into the ground to give the buildings a firm foundation. The Mall building are built atop those pilings.

Former attractions

Permanent
Shoot the Chutes -- a water ride in which a light skiff was raised to the top of a water-lubricated ramp, then released. It would gather speed and skip across the surface of a splashdown Lagoon. The Wonderland ride was purchased from the 1904 St. Louis Exposition, and was the largest in the world
Love's Journey -- a "Tunnel of Love" type of ride, but with many technical innovations. Its patent had not yet been granted when the Park opened. Wonderland had the very first one
Descent into the Hell Gate -- a Water ride in which boats followed a spiral track on an upper level, then suddenly shot down to a lower level when it got to the center. The lower level was decorated as a cavern, and the passengers disembarked and were led before the throne of Satan. Wonderland had the second such ride built.(The first was installed in Luna Park in Coney Island)
Circle Swing -- a tall tower with six arms from which long cables extended to support six "boats". The top of the tower rotated and sent the boats swinging outward by centrifugal force
Whirl the Whirl -- a large vertical shaft supported four arms that held "cars". As the set of cars rotated, they slowly rose, as well, describing a helical route. Wonderland's ride was the second one built. The first was at Coney Island
Infant Incubators -- the Incubators were open every season but one. They were the same installations that Dr. Martin A. Couney had placed at Coney Island and at amusement parks all across the country in an effort to popularize Incubators to rescue premature babies.
The LaMarcus A. Thompson Scenic Railway -- A staple of amusement parks, this was the first to be brought to Revere Beach. It featured a gently undulating track that took passengers out to an oval building where they were taken past dioramas of world scenes, such as Venice and Mount Vesuvius, before being brought back to the start.
Restaurant and Ballroom
Velvet Coaster -- a more traditional roller coaster went in beside the Shoot the Chutes ride in the Park's 1907 season and remained for the rest of the Park's life.

Short duration
Many other attractions were open for one to three years. Buildings were often repurposed.

The Beautiful Orient
The Flying Horses Carousel
The Fatal Wedding -- a magic illusion
William H. Kennedy's Wild West Show and Indian Congress
The South Before the War
The Japanese Village'''The Foolish House/The Third Degree/The House that Jack Built -- A funhouseHale's Tours/The Rocky Mountain Holdup/The World in Motion -- originally a sort of "virtual reality" ride, later a motion picture theaterWillard's Temple of MusicThe Pilgrim's Progress -- another funhouseUnder the Sea -- a giant glass-walled tank with swimmers, deep-sea divers, a "human fish", and an escape artistFire and Flames/Fighting the Flames -- a recreation of a city block, populated by actors, was set on fire and the latest fire-fighting gear was used to put out the flames and rescue the peoplePawnee Bill's Wild West ShowParadise -- The Show Beautiful -- a beauty pageant and talent showArcus Ring -- a circus ring with trapezes, high wires, and other fixtures for performersBand StandWild Animal ShowsThe Human LaundryBattle Abbey -- historical painting of Civil War battles, with a veteran to explain themA Balloon RideSkating RinkMiniature RailroadPalmists and AstrologersFlorida Alligator JungleDarktownReferences

Nazzaro, Edward and Nazzaro, Frederick Wonderland: Revere's Mystic City by the Sea Privately published (1983)
Wilk, Stephen Lost Wonderland'' University of Massachusetts Press (2020)

External links
 http://reverebeach.com/history-2/ - Includes many pictures
 http://cozybeach.com/oldrevere/revere-wonderland.shtml
https://www.lost-wonderland.com -- Many illustrations, photographs, postcards, and maps of Wonderland

Defunct amusement parks in the United States
Revere, Massachusetts
1906 establishments in Massachusetts
1911 disestablishments in Massachusetts